Cristian Deville (born 3 January 1981) is a World Cup alpine ski racer from Italy.

Career
Born in Cavalese, Trentino, he competes in the technical events and specializes in the slalom. Deville made his World Cup debut in January 2003, and has competed for Italy in three World Championships and the 2010 Olympics.

Through March 2013, Deville has one World Cup win, four podiums, and 19 top ten finishes, all in slalom.

World Cup results

Season standings 

Standings through 28 January 2018

Race podiums
 1 win – (1 SL)
 4 podiums – (4 SL)

References

External links
 
  
  
 

1981 births
Living people
Sportspeople from Trentino
Italian male alpine skiers
Olympic alpine skiers of Italy
Alpine skiers at the 2010 Winter Olympics
Alpine skiers of Fiamme Gialle